Stokka may refer to:

Stokka, Alstahaug, a village in Alstahaug municipality, Nordland county, Norway
Sandnessjøen Airport, Stokka, an airport in Alstahaug, Norway serving the city of Sandnessjøen
Stokka, Karmøy, a village in Karmøy municipality, Rogaland county, Norway
Stokka, Sandnes, a neighborhood in the city of Sandnes, Rogaland county, Norway
Stokka, Stavanger, a neighborhood in the city of Stavanger, Rogaland county, Norway
Stokka Church, a church in the city of Stavanger, Rogaland county, Norway
Stokka, Vevelstad, a village in Vevelstad municipality, Nordland county, Norway

See also
Stokke (disambiguation)